Evan Stewart (born June 11, 1975) is a former Olympic diver for Zimbabwe. He competed in three consecutive Summer Olympics for his native country, starting in 1992 (Barcelona, Spain).

Stewart captured two medals at the 1994 Commonwealth Games in Victoria, British Columbia, Canada. He is the son of former field hockey player Anthea Stewart, who won the gold medal in the women's competition at the 1980 Summer Olympics in Moscow, Soviet Union.

See also
 List of divers

References
 

Living people
1975 births
Sportspeople from Harare
Alumni of St. George's College, Harare
Zimbabwean male divers
Divers at the 1992 Summer Olympics
Divers at the 1994 Commonwealth Games
Divers at the 1996 Summer Olympics
Divers at the 1998 Commonwealth Games
Divers at the 2000 Summer Olympics
Olympic divers of Zimbabwe
Commonwealth Games gold medallists for Zimbabwe
Commonwealth Games silver medallists for Zimbabwe
Commonwealth Games bronze medallists for Zimbabwe
White Zimbabwean sportspeople
Zimbabwean people of British descent
World Aquatics Championships medalists in diving
Commonwealth Games medallists in diving
Medallists at the 1994 Commonwealth Games
Medallists at the 1998 Commonwealth Games